Brickhouses is a hamlet near Sandbach, Cheshire, England.

See also
Brickhouse (disambiguation)

References

Villages in Cheshire